The Pelham Racquet Club Pro Classic is a tournament for professional female tennis players played on outdoor clay courts. The event is classified as a $60,000 ITF Women's World Tennis Tour tournament and has been held in Pelham, Alabama, United States, since 2004.

Past finals

Singles

Doubles

External links
 ITF search

ITF Women's World Tennis Tour
Clay court tennis tournaments
Tennis tournaments in the United States
Recurring sporting events established in 2004